The   is a museum in Tokyo, Japan that presents information and artifacts related to the bombing of Tokyo during World War II.  The museum opened in 2002 and was renovated in 2005, the 60th anniversary of the bombings. In 2012, the Center presented an exhibition of 700 previously unseen photos from the bombing. As of 2022, the center received fewer than 10,000 visitors annually.

References

Further reading

External links

Official site (English version)
Interview with Tokyo bombing survivor about the museum, from Stars and Stripes

Museums in Tokyo
World War II museums in Japan
Buildings and structures in Koto, Tokyo
Museums established in 2002
2002 establishments in Japan